Alsodes igneus is a species of frogs in the family Alsodidae endemic to Chile; it is only known from its type locality, Tolhuaca National Park, Malleco Province, on the western slopes of the Andes. The specific name igneus, meaning "something that is of fire", was chosen to symbolize the survival of the population from a great forest fire that affected the type locality in 2000.

Description
The snout is short and slightly truncated in dorsal view. There is a black ribbon extending below the canthus rostralis; the background colour is khaki. The dorsal surface is granular. Toes are scarcely fringed and webbing is absent.

Habitat
The habitat of A. igneus is Nothofagus woodland; adults have been found at the edge of a small stream and the tadpoles among rocks within the stream.

References

igneus
Endemic fauna of Chile
Amphibians of Chile
Amphibians of Patagonia
Frogs of South America
Amphibians described in 2005
Taxonomy articles created by Polbot